Home at Seven is a 1950 British mystery play by R.C. Sheriff. The original production, starring Ralph Richardson, opened at the Theatre Royal, Brighton in February 1950. It transferred to Wyndham's Theatre in the West End on 7 March 1950, for a run of 342 performances. Variety called it "one of the major successes of the legit season."

Plot
David Preston returns home from work to his wife Janet to find that 24 hours have elapsed without him even realising it, and it is now a day later than he thought. As hard as he tries, he cannot recall the missing day. Evidence then emerges suggesting that he was involved in a theft and murder that happened in the period that he cannot account for.

Original cast
David Preston - Ralph Richardson
Dr. Sparling - Cyril Raymond
Major Watson - Philip Stainton
Inspector Hemingway - Campbell Singer
Mr. Petherbridge - Frederick Piper
Mrs. Preston - Marian Spencer
Peggy Dobson - Meriel Forbes

Adaptations
In 1952 the play was adapted as a film Home at Seven directed by and starring Ralph Richardson, with many of the stage cast reprising their roles.

References

1950 plays
British plays adapted into films
Plays by R. C. Sherriff
West End plays